Varsha Usgaonkar (born 28 February 1968), is an Indian actress, model and singer from Goa. She has worked in various Marathi as well as Bollywood movies as a leading actress. During the 1990s, she was the most popular actress in Marathi cinema.

Career
Usgaonkar first shot to fame in 1984 as the lead heroine in the super-hit Marathi stage play Brahmachari. Subsequently, she quickly rose to one of the top actresses in the Marathi film industry with super-hit productions such as Gammat Jammat, Hamal De Dhamal, Saglikade Bombabomb, Sawat Majhi Ladki, Shejari Shejari, Ek Hota Vidushak,  Lapandav and Aflatoon. She starred as a lead actress in Bollywood films, Ghar Aaya Mera Pardesi and Pathreela Raasta. In 2005, she appeared in the Bollywood films Mangal Pandey: The Rising and Mr Ya Miss as a supporting actress. 

In the Faisal Saif-directed controversial Hindi feature film, Jigyaasa, she played the role of a "mother" to Hrishitaa Bhatt. Usgaonkar started her television career in 1988 playing the role of Uttara, wife of Abhimanyu and mother of Parikshit, (the future of the Bharat Dynasty TV serial Mahabharata). The role led her to many Hindi movie offers and most of them failed to create a box office success. She also played "Roopmati" (Snake Queen) in the 1994 TV serial Chandrakanta. She has appeared in the Marathi shows Aakash Zep and Eka Mekansathi and has acted in the Hindi television serials Alvida Darling, Tanha and Anhonee.

One of her most prominent performances was on the TV serial Jhansi Ki Rani in the 1990s on Doordarshan, where she played the lead character of Rani Lakshmibai. Usgaonkar is also a singer and has sung in a Konkani music album Roop Tujem Laita Pixem, with Ulhas Buyao. She is currently playing the supporting role of Nandini Yashwant Shirke-Patil in Star Pravah's popular serial Sukh Mhanje Nakki Kay Asta.

Personal life

Usgaonkar is a Konkani speaker born and raised in Goa. She is the daughter of Goa's former deputy speaker, A. K. S. Usgaonkar. She has two sisters, Tosha Kurade and Manisha Tarcar.

Usgaonkar married Ajay Sharma, son of Indian film music director, Ravi Shankar Sharma in March 2000.

Filmography

See also

 List of Indian film actresses

References

External links

Konkani film ‘Zanvoy No.1’ released amidst fanfare

Living people
Actresses from Goa
Indian television actresses
Konkani people
Actresses in Marathi cinema
Konkani-language singers
Actresses in Marathi theatre
Actresses in Hindi cinema
Singers from Goa
Indian women playback singers
21st-century Indian actresses
20th-century Indian actresses
Women musicians from Goa
Dr. Babasaheb Ambedkar Marathwada University alumni
1968 births